Angelo Solimena (Serino, 17 November 1629 – Nocera Inferiore, February 1716) was an Italian painter, father of the better known Francesco Solimena.

Life
Solimena was a pupil of Francesco Guarino. One of his earliest paintings is the Pentecost, dated 1654, in San Michele in Solofra, the town in which Guarnino also worked. Solimena later worked in Nocera Inferiore, where he painted a Deposition in the church of San Matteo in 1664, and Gravina, where he painted the Madonna and Saints in the church of the Purgatorio .

In 1674-5 he painted a series of frescoes in the church of San Giorgio in Salerno, and visited Naples at around the same time. He worked in collaboration with his son, Francesco, on the Vision of St Cyril of Alexandria at the church of San Domenico in Solofra.

He later worked at Sarno, where he painted the vaults and other pictures at the cathedral.

References

External links

1629 births
1716 deaths
17th-century Italian painters
Italian male painters
18th-century Italian painters
People from Nocera Inferiore
18th-century Italian male artists